The Cortes republicanas, officially called Cortes – also called the Congreso de los Diputados – were the unicameral legislature of the Second Spanish Republic between 1931 and 1939. After the end of the Civil War they met several times in exile, the last in 1945.

History 
After the constituent elections of 1931, the Cortes, in charge of drawing up a new Constitution, were inaugurated on 14 July 1931. The composition of the chamber in the constituent period was dominated by the centre and left parties, the majority being Republican – socialist. The socialist Julián Besteiro was the first president of the Cortes, first interim and then definitively elected on 28 July 1931. On 1 October 1931, the Chamber approved the constitutional article that would enshrine women's suffrage with 161 votes in favour and 121 against. The 1931 Constitution was finally approved on 9 December 1931 with 368 votes in favour and none against (89 right-wing deputies absent). The text regulated the figure of the Permanent Deputation, with the function of assuming the functions of the parliamentary chamber during its parentheses. In July 1933, the Chamber would approve an electoral law that would accentuate the premium for majorities that had already been introduced by the legislation promulgated by the provisional government before the first elections of 1931 were held.

The 1933 elections, already held under the new legislation, gave rise to a parliamentary change and a chamber with the right-wing CEDA as the largest parliamentary group. Opened on 8 December 1933, the new Cortes provisionally elected the radical Santiago Alba as president of the chamber. In November 1934, the change in the regulations of the Cortes was approved.

The 1936 elections, also developed with the electoral law of 1933, gave a parliamentary majority to the left-wing Popular Front. The Republican Diego Martínez Barrio would be elected president of the Cortes.

During the course of the civil war, the Cortes did not meet again in Madrid and became itinerant: they held sessions in 1937 in Valencia (in the Valencia City Hall building and in the Lonja de la Seda) and in 1938 in the monastery of Montserrat and in San Cugat. Close to the end of the conflict, the Cortes, on their way to exile, held their last session in Spanish territory on 1 February 1939 in the castle of San Fernando de Figueras, closing this session at 12:45 p.m.

Once the civil war ended and the dictatorship of Francisco Franco was established throughout the Spanish territory in 1939, the Cortes republicanas continued to meet in exile.

Elections

Electoral constituencies 
The legislation of May 1931 introduced by the Provisional Government modified the Decree of 8 August 1907 and the Restoration districts by provincial constituencies, with the exception of province capitals with a population of more than 100,000 inhabitants, which were constituted as independent constituencies to the provincial. In addition, Cartagena, Ceuta and Melilla also formed a circumscription. The 1931 elections were therefore carried out with 63 constituencies.

After the implementation of the electoral law of 1933, with the increase to 150,000 inhabitants of the necessary population of a provincial capital to establish itself as an independent constituency from the provincial one, the capitals of Córdoba and Granada lost their constituency status. The Cartagena constituency used in 1931 was integrated into that of Murcia (province) for the 1933 and 1936 elections.

Elections held 

 1931 Spanish general election
 1933 Spanish general election
 1936 Spanish general election

See also 
 Cortes Generales
 Cortes Españolas

References

Bibliography 

 

Second Spanish Republic
Unicameral legislatures
Defunct unicameral legislatures
1931 establishments in Spain
1939 disestablishments in Spain